Jude Lemfani Abaga (born 4 October 1981), better known as M.I Abaga, is a Nigerian rapper, singer, songwriter and record producer. He rose to prominence in 2006 when his song "Crowd Mentality" became popular in Jos, Nigeria. His debut studio album Talk About It was released in 2008. The LP was succeeded by MI 2: The Movie (2010). Four years later, he released The Chairman as his third studio album.  Abaga released the playlist Rendezvous in February 2018. In August of that year, he released his fourth studio album A Study On Self Worth: Yxng Dxnzl.

Abaga was CEO of Chocolate City from 2015 to 2019. In March 2020, he announced his exit from the label and launched his own record label Incredible Music.

He won Best Hip Hop and Best New Act at the 2009 MTV Africa Music Awards, and was nominated in the Best International Act category at the BET Awards 2010.

Early life
Jude was born in Jos, Plateau State. His parents, Pastor and Mrs. Abaga, are from Takum, Taraba state, both of Jukun-Nigerian descent. He attended Baptist High School, Jos where his mother purchased basic music notations and later, a 7-key mini piano which launched him into the music world. Jude has two brothers, Jesse Jagz, who is also in the Nigerian and African music scene, and Jason Abaga. During Jude's adolescence, he would listen to tracks from Lauryn Hill, Bob Marley, Sarah Maclachlan, Pablo Neruda, Jay-Z and DMX.

Jude's venture into the hip hop world started with the sampling of musical works from DMX and Lauryn Hill as early as 1998. After his time at Calvin College, Michigan, US, he delved into poetry while pursuing a career in Business and Economics. There, he performed regularly at the school's major hip hop shows and concerts. His rapping gained him a third-place finish at the Calvin College show named 'Hip Hopera' in 2003, which was the only "hip hop show" that Calvin College has ever had. M.I. also made some amateur attempts at comedy, but decided to stick to music.

Career

Jude began his music career when he returned to Nigeria in 2003. Finding his place in an industry dominated by the likes of Modenine, Ruggedman and Eedris Abdulkareem, he quickly commenced the production of mixtapes with his friend Djinee. This led to the critically acclaimed single "Safe" (a song which he parodied popular Nigerian songs in its lyrics) which gathered impressive airplay by African radio and music video stations such as MTV Vibe. The track also earned him awards at the Nigerian Music Video Awards, City People, N.E.A among others.

The hype surrounding the release of Safe led to the critical acclaim given to his first studio album titled Talk About It which was rated 8.5/10 by Oye Akideinde of 360nobs  The album gathered awards such as Musician of the Year (Modemen Awards in 2008) and Best Hip Hop Artist (City People Awards). His first mixtape was PYERIBOY. He later released a sample mixtape titled Illegal Music in 2009. The mixtape was followed by Illegal Music II which was released in 2012.

Back in Jos, Nigeria, he teamed up with his brother, Jesse Jagz, Ice Prince, Ruby, Threadstone, Lindsay, Moses (Elbulk), and E kelly to form Loopy Music. M.I was later signed to the Chocolate City company, a renowned music label in Nigeria, which made him move from Jos city to the nation's capital, Abuja, and also influenced the beginning of his successful career in the Nigerian music industry. He has also received international recognition in South Africa from the popular Channel O music Award, MTVbase Awards and the American BET Awards. A proficient producer, lyricist, songwriter and instrumentalist, M.I has been described by DIV as the future of African hip-hop. He has produced and featured on the works of artists like, Don Jazzy, Threadstone (Nigeria's first rock band ), Kel, Djinee, Shifi (Styl Plus), Jesse Jagz, Ice Prince, Hyce-age, Ruby, Lindsey, Leony, Wizkid etc. He also runs a production company, Rychus Era Productions with his brother Jesse Abaga (Jesse Jagz). In 2013 he was appointed by Nigerian telecommunication company Glo Mobile as a brand ambassador alongside other Nigerian artistes like Omawumi, Burna Boy etc. He was also a judge in Glo X-Factor, the Nigerian version of the reality singing show in 2013.

Illegal Music 3 - The Finale was released on 29 February 2016. The ten-track mixtape was made available online for free, gathering over 400,000 downloads in just three days.

On 9 February 2018 a seventh studio project titled Rendezvous, a playlist with a style generally different from the regular. The project came as a surprise to fans as it was released merely a day after the rapper announced the release date for Yxng Dxnzl.

Yxng Dxnzl (pronounced Yung Denzl) was itself released on 24 August 2018, about three months later than the initial release date. The album was tagged "A Study on Self Worth" and included the single You Rappers Should Fix Up Your Lives - which triggered a slew of responses. The album was released as part of a collection of Nigerian rap albums titled LAMB August, with the aim of re-awakening rap music in Nigeria. All three albums, Crown by A-Q and Loose Kaynon, Yung Denzl by M.I Abaga & BadBoyBlaq by Blaqbonez were executively produced by M.I. On 6 March 2020, the rapper announced his departure from Chocolate City after 13 years of being a part of the label.

Personal life 
On 22 September 2022, M. I and Eniola Mafe married in Lagos.

Rapping technique
Tripol of Blaze-A-Mic describes M.I's flow as "easy going but packed full of punches". Similarities in styles have also been drawn to renowned rappers such as Kanye West, Lil Wayne and Jay-Z. Those who know M.I. well have also compared his ego with both that of Kanye West and Jay-Z.

Contributions and recognition 
M.I. has been responsible for bringing out many upcoming artists such as Phyno, Wizkid, Vypa, Jesse Jagz, Ruby, Pype, Tone Ice Prince, Brymo, and Khali Graph Jones. He has been described by many Nigerian hip hop fans as Nigeria's "Hip Hop Messiah".
MI has done a lot to bring a Northern presence to the Nigerian music industry, as he depicts the perfect example of bringing Nigeria together. He is the founder of Loopy Records and Incredible Music. M.I also worked in music production with Chocolate City, and has produced albums and songs for his label mates. The most notable of these being in 2011 when he produced two songs off Ice Prince's album Everybody Loves Ice Prince and recently Ruby Gyang's Good Man off her "This Is Love" Ep.

M.I was appointed a United Nations Goodwill Ambassador in 2012. M.I also supports the Jostified campaign. He has achieved worldwide recognition as part of the vanguard of the "Afrobeats" wave.

Feuds

Kelly Hansome
There has been a rivalry between Nigerian artists, M.I. Abaga and Kelly Hansome. This started when M.I. in his track Fast Money, Fast Cars stated, "Kelly Hansome is handsome, I'll tell him when I see him. But if I want a man, it'd be Keke or D1". Kelly Hansome did not take kindly to these words and from there they both have gone track for track with Kelly Hansome releasing Catch Me If You Can, where he goes in on the whole Chocolate City label. In response, the Choc City camp released Nobody Test Me with a line from M.I talking directly to Kelly Hansome, saying, " Only one Kelly that I know, Kelly Rowland. Why would I diss them, give them cheap promotion. I think that they're so dry, I should give them lotion". Later, Kelly Hansome released Chocolate Boys (Chocolate City members). M.I. released a track on his 2010 album, M.I.2 named Beef. With Kelly hearing this, brought out the track Finish You Boy.

Iceberg Slim
In 2009 a US-based rapper by the name Iceberg Slim released a single titled Mr International where he said the lines: "Am I better than M.I? I don't know. Am I? Matter of fact you should ask M.I". That apparently didn't sit too well with M.I, prompting him to release a single known as "Somebody Wants To Die", featuring his label mate Ice Prince on the track. Less than 48 hours after the release of M.I's "Somebody Wants to Die" IceBerg Slim released "Assassination" and sources quote that his Facebook status at the time of the release read "Somebody Wants To Die", I'll be responsible for the "Assassination" … let the countdown begin … (I told em it would be a M.I.stake, but they didn't listen)". There was a contest in the mind of rap fans on who happened to be the best rapper in Nigeria.  M.I developed more fans than Iceberg Slim and had more hit records, while Iceberg Slim gained hearts on Nigerian rap fans in a very short and unusual period. In 2012, both rappers decided to sweep the feud under the rug. Iceberg stated, "I don't think I picked on MI. It was a healthy competition in Hip-Hop, which most people don't understand. In Hip-Hop community, we could be best friends or brothers and I can say I'm the best rapper in the world and no one takes offense or takes it personal. My shot at MI wasn't a sign of disrespect in any way. Though sarcastic, it was healthy. People just took it out of context and thought I was dissing him. Rap music is all about competition because it helps you grow and improve on yourself."

NotJustOk
M.I's popularity has grown quickly over the years in Nigeria as he has become one of the most critically acclaimed rap artists, and has recently been compared to other artists like Naeto C, el Dee, D'banj, 9ice and Mode 9. He was listed as the fourth most talented rapper in Nigeria by online music site Notjustok.com. The ranking didn't sit well with M.I and he used the song NotJustOk/Savage (Track 5) on his 2016 released mixtape Illegal Music 3 to address the issue of him being compared to other Nigerian rap stars. He explicitly demanded that critics leave his name off any list and stop rating, ranking or criticizing music they didn't help create just because the critic wants to gain more traction, followers and boost their ratings.

Vector 
M.I and Vector had an ongoing rap supremacy spat overtime to claim who was the best Hip Hop act in Nigeria, In 2019, it led to M.I releasing a diss track "The Viper", he insinuated how he had helped entertainers compared to Vector. He said, "See we rise by lifting others, who you lifted? Nobody in all these years. Can say that Vector put em in position wow."

Vector hit out at M.I in the diss track "Judas, the rat", responding to his claims he said,

"Jesse Jagz, you're my buddy, I couldn't do this in a hurry but the truth about your brother has been blurry. So sometime in this sermon, I will say some uncomfortable facts to show his fans their GOAT (Greatest Of All Time) is really a rat. Let's start the lecture.

"Who are the rappers that I put on?  Many more plus two out of your three and I didn't sign anything. I did it all for free since you were scratching on the surface like your DJ Lambo. How about the guns you brought to help become rambo?...So what am I supposed to do Sign a man I wouldn't sign? I don't do politics music.

"Yoruba people would say, 'Eni dale lo bale lo.' Ambode is leaving with VisionScape"

In December 2020, Vector and Jude "M.I" Abaga seem to have squashed their battle when they both met in the third and final part of "The Conversation", a Hennessy Nigeria documentary series based on the rivalry between M.I and Vector, the duo met face-to-face and discussed what transpired between them. Both rappers addressed what caused the beef and their thoughts on each other. M.I said he had the impression that Vector just doesn't like him, while Vector said he believes M.I is cunning and deceptive.

They finally had a collaboration when Vector featured M.I on a song titled Crown of Clay in March 2021 which emphasized the positive attributes of being African and called out the negative impacts of white supremacy and imperialism. The two lyrical juggernauts also worked together on a song called 'Spirit' which was the first track on a seven-song EP called Hennessy ‘The Very Special Tape Volume 1.' The EP was a collaborative effort by the Cognac company to boost the rap culture in Africa and features other rappers like Payper Corleone, Preacher Kingz, Dabu The Gemini and Hennessy VS Class VII winner Matosan.

Discography

Studio albums
 Talk About It (2008)
 MI 2: The Movie (2010)
 The Chairman (2014)
 A Study on Self Worth: Yxng Dxnzl (2018)
 The Guy (2022)

 Compilation albums
 The Indestructible Choc Boi Nation (with Chocolate City) (2015)

Mixtapes and playlists
 Illegal Music (2009)
 Illegal Music 2 (2012)
 Illegal Music 3: The Finale (2016)
 Rendezvous (2018)

EPs
 Judah (2020)
 The Live Report (with A-Q) (2020)

Filmography

Awards and nominations

See also
 List of Nigerian rappers

References

1981 births
Living people
Nigerian songwriters
Nigerian male rappers
Musicians from Jos
21st-century Nigerian musicians
The Headies winners
21st-century male musicians